Bagh Bid or Baghbid or Bagh-i-Bid, also known as Bab Bid and Babid, may refer to:
 Bagh Bid, Kerman
 Bagh Bid-e Olya, Kerman Province
 Bagh Bid-e Sofla, Kerman Province
 Bagh Bid, Yazd